Leaf Brands, LLC is a candy company based in Newport Coast, Newport Beach, California. The original Leaf International (also known as the "Leaf Candy Company") started in the 1940s. Leaf International was once the fourth largest candy producer in North America, producing such products as Whoppers, Jolly Rancher, Milk Duds, Rain-Blo bubble gum, the Heath bar and PayDay, before it sold the U.S. division to The Hershey Company in 1996 and left the United States.

In 2011, the company was revived, and the newly re-formed company made its official debut at the 2011 Sweets & Snacks Expo. Ellia Kassoff, the nephew of Ed Leaf, (possibly a relative of Sol S. Leaf, the founder of Leaf Candy Company), is the CEO. The company registered the Hydrox trademark which had been abandoned by former owner Kellogg's, and re-created the brand of cookies, similar to Oreos, which had been out of production since 1999. Leaf Brands began selling the product through Amazon Marketplace in September 2015.

Current brands 

 Astro Pops
 David's Jelly Beans
 Farts Candy
 Hydrox
 Tart 'n' Tinys
 Wacky Wafers
 Yummers!

References

External links
 

Confectionery companies of the United States
Companies based in Newport Beach, California
Companies established in the 1920s